"Ese Hombre" (English: "That Man") is a song written by María Angélica Ramírez and first performed by Puerto Rican singer Nydia Caro on her album Unicornio Azul (1983). It was later covered by Chilean singer Myriam Hernández on her album Myriam Hernández IV in 1994. The album marked Hernández's return to the music scene after taking a break from recording for nearly two years. It was recorded in Los Angeles, California and produced by Humberto Gatica. The song became Hernández first number one song on the Billboard Latin Pop Airplay chart and ended the year as the best-performing Latin pop song in the United States. It was recognized as one of best-performing songs of the year at the 1996 ASCAP Latin Awards. A music video for "Ese Hombre" was filmed as well.

Charts

Weekly charts

Year-end charts

See also
List of number-one Billboard Latin Pop Airplay songs of 1995

References

1994 singles
1983 songs
Spanish-language songs
1990s ballads
Pop ballads
Myriam Hernández songs